Mugoše (also spelled Magushi, Moguši) was a historical tribe (pleme) and area in the Brda region of Montenegro. Mugoše were located around the region of Piperi. Toponyms related to them can be found in many parts of the region, such as Mugošina Livada in Komani.

Etymology

Mugoše were originally an Albanian tribe. The term magusha means buffalo-calf in Proto-Albanian (modern Albanian, meksh).

History
Mugoše may have been immigrants from modern Albania, settling in Brda around the 12th and 13th centuries

The name Magusi is mentioned in the 1416-17 Venetian cadaster of Scutari. In it, a Gjergj Magusi is mentioned as living in the village of Shën Auraç, as well as the late Pjetër Magusi leader of an uprising against Venice and former landholder. 

While not considered as a tribe anymore, some Montenegrins bear the Mugoša surname. During World War II, many of them joined the Yugoslav Partisans. According to 2006 data, 779 people had the surname in Podgorica; people with the surname are represented above average in local politics service in the capital.

Culture
Oral traditions from the Mugoša family connect them to the Kastrioti family of medieval Albania. They maintain that their ancestors arrived from the tribal territory of the Kastrati in  Malësia and that they had first settled in Kuči. Legends from Piperi, however, claim that they originally occupied the lands between Radovče and Kopilje prior to being expelled by the incoming Lužani.

Notable People 
Stefan Mugoša (born 1992), Montenegrin footballer
Miomir Mugoša (born 1950), Montenegrin physician and politician
Svetlana Mugoša-Antić (born 1964), former Yugoslav handball player
Sonja Mugosa (born 1989), Serbian-Montenegrin figure skater
Marko Mugoša (basketball) (born 1993), Montenegrin basketball player
Marko Mugoša (born 1984) former Montenegrin footballer
Ljiljana Mugoša (born 1962), former Yugoslav handball player
Dijana Mugoša (born 1995), Montenegrin handball player
Dušan Mugoša (1914-1973), Yugoslav partisan
 (1904-1942), Yugoslav partisan

See also
Špiro Mugoša Airport

References

Further reading

Tribes of Albania
Tribes of Montenegro
Albanian communities in Montenegro